Aymett Town is an unincorporated community in Giles County, Tennessee, in the United States.

History
A post office called Aymett was established in 1894, and remained in operation until it was discontinued in 1902. The community was named for Allen Aymett, an early settler.

References

Unincorporated communities in Giles County, Tennessee
Unincorporated communities in Tennessee